Okenia vena is a species of sea slug, specifically a dorid nudibranch, a marine gastropod mollusc in the family Goniodorididae.

Distribution
This species was described from northern New South Wales, Australia. It is known only from eastern Australia.

Description
This Okenia has a narrow body and seven to eight lateral papillae on each side and papillae in the middle of the back. The body is white and the rhinophores are brown. There is a pattern of broken brown lines on the back and tail.

Ecology
The diet of this species is the ctenostome bryozoan Amathia tortuosa.

References

Goniodorididae
Gastropods described in 2004